The Fly America Act refers to the provisions enacted by .

The Fly America Act is applicable to all travel funded by United States federal government funds and requires the use of "U.S. flag" airlines (not to be confused with flag carriers) with a few exceptions. These individuals include U.S. federal government employees, their dependents, consultants, contractors, grantees, and others.

The Fly America Act is incorporated into the Federal Acquisition Regulations (FAR) at Subpart 47.4—Air Transportation by U.S.‑Flag Carriers and is, therefore, applicable to all U.S. government contracts issued to U.S. and non‑U.S. companies, except for commercial item contractors, which are exempt from the act under Part 12.503 of the FAR.

The Fly America Act does not prohibit travel funded by civilian government agencies on carriers associated with nations that have a qualifying "bilateral or multilateral agreement" with the United States; however, travelers must complete a declaration that such an agreement exists. Although the United States has entered into more than 100 Open Skies agreements, only a few of them are considered qualifying "bilateral or multilateral agreement[s]"; they are the agreements with the European Union (including non‑EU members Norway and Iceland), Australia, Saudi Arabia, Switzerland, and Japan. A full list of Open Skies partners is available from the U.S. State Department.

British owned airlines will no longer be part of the Fly America program after the United Kingdom left the European Union.

See also
 Bilateral air transport agreement
 Open skies

References

Aviation in the United States
United States federal transportation legislation
Aviation law
1975 in American law
93rd United States Congress